Dominic Maker is an English Grammy-nominated record producer and songwriter from Brighton. He is best known as one half of the duo Mount Kimbie and for his production work for artists such as James Blake, Slowthai, Rosalía and Jay-Z. Dom Maker initially met Kai Campos at Southbank uni where he was studying film. Their debut album was released in 2010 and since signing to Warp in 2012 they have released a further two albums.

After moving to L.A. in 2017, he began to work more closely with James Blake, co-producing and co-writing a number of tracks on the album Assume Form. Through this he worked with Jay-Z on "MaNyfaCedGod".

He professes to not listening to much music outside work but has often been forced to in his new role as a producer for research purposes stating: "I don’t know that world very well, so I need to become more familiar with the things that are going on and the techniques people use...It does feel a little bit like research. Another project for James and I, we’re working with this guy Swavay, who’s a really great rapper from Atlanta."

In 2020, he was announced as co-producer for James Blake's new single "You're Too Precious" and in May he was announced as the producer of Slowthai's single "Bodybag". Along with artists like Erick the Architect from Flatbush Zombies, he also co-produced James Blake's latest release, the Before EP, and together with Blake, they produced Starrah's single "Keep Calm" which was released on 23 October 2020.

Maker collaborated on the tracks "Feel Away", "Focus" and "Push" from Slowthai's UK number one album Tyron. Following an interview with Highsnobiety, the "Feel Away" collaboration was described by Maker as an “instinctive piece of music”, going on to discuss how the track came to fruition. “You know who would be sick on this?” Ty suggested. “James — James should sing on it.” Maker sent the track to Blake, who was in New York at the time, and received his contribution a day later, with additional vocals and piano.

In 2021, Maker contributed to the soundtrack of the Oscar-winning short film Two Distant Strangers, co-producing the closing track "Two Distant Strangers" which features Joey Badass.

Maker, along with James Blake, co-produced the unreleased Travis Scott and Westside Gunn track that was premiered at the Cactus Jack Dior Summer 2022 fashion show in Paris.

In November 2021, Maker received a Grammy nomination for his co production work on James Blake's track 'Before'. The song was nominated for Best Dance/Electronic Recording.

In July 2022 Dom remixed the title track from Flume’s 2022 album ‘Palaces’, for which he brought Zelooperz for a new remix feature alongside the existing guest appearance from Gorillaz and Blur’s Damon Albarn.

September 2022 saw Dom announce the first full-length Mount Kimbie release since 2017’s Love What Survives. His half of the double album, entitled ‘Die Cuts’ will release along with the full project in November 2022.

Maker preluded the release of the album with a double-sided single release, with ‘A Deities Encore’ featuring Liv.e and ‘In Your Eyes’ featuring Slowthai and Danny Brown. ‘Locked In’, a bonus track featuring Maxo Kream and Pa Salieu, was released the day prior to the album announcement.

Discography

Production

References 

1986 births
Living people
English record producers
English songwriters
Musicians from Brighton and Hove